Broad Left is a coalition of leftist members, usually involving independents, members of the Labour Party (UK) (although some people deny that the Labour Party still constitute as "broad left"), and members of organised revolutionary leftist movements within a trade union, or members of a political party that appeals to a wide range of leftist ideologies, such as Left Unity (UK).

References

Sources
 
 

Political organisations based in the United Kingdom